Byk may refer to:

 Bîc River or Byk, a river in Moldova
 Byk River, a river in Ukraine
 BYK or Bouaké Airport

People with the surname 
 Emil Byk (1845–1906)

See also 
 Byk Gulden